Isabelle Berro (born 24 October 1965), also known as Isabelle Berro-Amadeï, is a Monégasque judge born in Monaco and who was the Judge of the European Court of Human Rights in respect of Monaco from 27 June 2006 to 1 August 2015. She was appointed Ambassador of Monaco to Germany, Austria and Poland in 2016.

References

1965 births
Living people
Foreign ministers of Monaco
Judges of the European Court of Human Rights
Monegasque judges
Monegasque judges of international courts and tribunals
Ambassadors of Monaco to Austria
Ambassadors of Monaco to Germany
Ambassadors of Monaco to Poland
Monegasque women ambassadors
Female foreign ministers